Samuel Losuron Poghisio is a Kenyan politician serving as the incumbent Majority Leader of the Kenyan Senate. He belongs to the Kenya African National Union - KANU and was previously a member of the United Republican Party - URP and the Orange Democratic Movement-Kenya and was elected to represent the Kacheliba Constituency in the National Assembly of Kenya since the 2007 Kenyan parliamentary election.

He was first elected to the parliament in 1988, and also in 1997 and 2002. Until 2007 elections he represented the KANU party.

His Kacheliba Constituency parliamentary seat was taken over by Mark Lomunokol in the 2013 elections having opted to vie for the Senatorial seat unsuccessfully.

He is currently serving as the Senator for West Pokot County as from 2017 - 2022

References

Living people
Orange Democratic Movement politicians
Kenya African National Union politicians
Members of the National Assembly (Kenya)
1958 births